Explicit Content may refer to:

 Parental Advisory, warning label used by the music industry
 Explicit Content (song), 2019 song by Hong Kong singer-songwriter Charmaine Fong
 Explicit content in Wikipedia

See also 
 Explicit (disambiguation)